William George Marks (9 April 1915 – 22 January 1998) was an English association football player, who played as a goalkeeper.

Born in Figheldean, Wiltshire, Marks started his career at local club Salisbury Corinthians before joining Arsenal as an amateur in March 1936; he turned professional two months later. Marks spent two years on loan at Arsenal's nursery club Margate before returning in May 1938. He played twice for Arsenal before the outbreak of war, but served mainly as understudy to George Swindin and Alex Wilson; however he did play the final two games of the 1938-39 season, his debut coming against Derby County on 29 April 1939. His second and final league appearance in goal for Arsenal was memorable, as it was their 2–0 win over Brentford at Highbury, a match recorded on film for the movie The Arsenal Stadium Mystery.

Official football was suspended during the war; Marks served in the Royal Air Force in Northern Ireland, but still found time to play 129 wartime matches for Arsenal and win one Football League War Cup and two Football League South medals, as well as eight wartime caps for England. Once war was over and football resumed, Marks was deemed too old for Arsenal and sold for £5,000 in August 1946 to Blackburn Rovers - at the time a record fee for a keeper. Despite spending ten years with Arsenal, thanks to the war Marks had only two official League appearances to his name.

He spent two seasons with Rovers, his career there punctuated by a period out with a jaw injury. He moved to Bristol City in August 1948, but stayed only two months before signing for Reading. There he spent five years before retiring as a player. He went on to be a coach with Reading for two years before quitting the game entirely, and becoming a local government officer in his native Wiltshire. He died in 1998, aged 82.

References

1915 births
1998 deaths
People from Wiltshire
English footballers
Association football goalkeepers
Arsenal F.C. players
Margate F.C. players
Blackburn Rovers F.C. players
Bristol City F.C. players
Reading F.C. players
Stoke City F.C. wartime guest players
England wartime international footballers
Royal Air Force personnel of World War II